Melluish is a surname. Notable people with the surname include:

Gordon Melluish (1906–1977), English cricketer
Mike Melluish (1932–2014), English cricketer and cricket administrator

See also
Mellish